Michael Lombard  born Michael LaBombarda (August 8, 1934 - August 13, 2020) was an American actor. His parents, both from Giovinazzo, Bari, Italy, emigrated to America and settled in Gravesend, Brooklyn. In 1977, he was nominated for a Drama Desk Award for his performance in Otherwise Engaged.  In 1991, he won an Obie Award for his performance in What's Wrong With This Picture? On television, Lombard portrayed Marshall Beck in all 15 episodes of Filthy Rich (1982-1983). Between 1976 and 2005 he had guest roles in such popular American television series as Kojak (a 2-part episode), The Mary Tyler Moore Hour (9 episodes), The Rockford Files (a 2-part episode), Three’s Company, Riptide, Spenser: For Hire, Miami Vice, The Cosby Show, and 4 episodes of Law & Order and its spinoffs. He played a different character on 4 episodes of Barney Miller.

Partial filmography
Who? (1974) - Dr. Besser
Network (1976) - Willie Stein
Fatso (1980) - Charlie
So Fine (1981) - Jay Augustine
Garbo Talks (1984) - Mr. Morganelli
Prizzi's Honor (1985) - Rosario Filargi / Robert Finlay
Crocodile Dundee (1986) - Sam Charlton
Pet Sematary (1989) - Irwin Goldman
Second Sight (1989) - Bishop O'Linn
Millions (1991) - Tony Steiner
The Devil's Advocate (1997) - Judge Poe
Rounders (1998) - District Attorney Shields
The Thomas Crown Affair (1999) - Bobby McKinley
Puppet (1999) - Ulianov
Dead Canaries (2003) - Mayor
La Vraie Vie des profs (2013) - Professeur De Dessin (final film role)

References

External links
 
 
 

1934 births
Obie Award recipients
20th-century American male actors
American male film actors
American people of Italian descent
American male stage actors
2020 deaths
Male actors from New York City
21st-century American male actors